The Tuttlingen–Hattingen railway line, also called the Hattingen curve, is a railway line Baden-Württemberg, Germany.

Services 

References

External links 
 
 OpenRailwayMap

Railway lines in Baden-Württemberg